Adria Media Balkan is a publishing company stationed in Skopje, North Macedonia. They publish the daily newspaper Sloboden Pečat.

Adria Media Balkan is owned by Adria Media Group from Serbia that is owned by Gruner + Jahr from Germany. Gruner + Jahr is a subsidiary of the biggest conglomerate in Germany, Bertelsmann.

References 

Publishing companies of North Macedonia
Bertelsmann subsidiaries